Matun is a Cuban village in Cienfuegos Province. It is part of the municipality of Abreus.

Geography
The little village is located in south of the municipality, near Yaguaramas and the borders with Zapata Swamp, in the Province of Matanzas.

See also
Juraguá

References

Populated places in Cienfuegos Province